Choriolaus howdeni is a species of beetle in the family Cerambycidae. It was described by Giesbert and Wappes in 1999.

References

Choriolaus
Beetles described in 1999